Class 52 may refer to:

British Rail Class 52
DRB Class 52, German locomotive class
DRG Class 52.70, a Saxon Class III steam locomotive